Tarka is a Local Government Area of Benue State, Nigeria. Its headquarters is in the town of Wannune.
 
It has an area of 371 km and a population of 79,494 at the 2006 census.

The postal code of the area is 981.

References

Local Government Areas in Benue State